The Grahame-White Baby was an early British aircraft designed by pioneer aviator Claude Grahame-White in 1910.

Design
The Grahame White Baby was a single-seat biplane pusher, of the then orthodox "Farman" layout, with a frontal elevator and a rear-mounted empennage consisting of a biplane horizontal stabilisers with single elevator mounted on the top surface and a single central rudder. As the name suggests, it was considerably smaller than most contemporary aircraft of a similar layout, having a wingspan of only . In comparison, the wingspan of a standard Bristol Boxkite was 34 ft 6 in (10.5 m). An unusual feature of the aircraft was the mounting for the 50 hp (37 kW) Gnome rotary engine, which was mounted on a pair of angled beams so that the engine was midway between the upper and lower wings.

The Burgess Company in the United States purchased a licence to build it as the Model E.

Specifications

See also

References
Notes

Bibliography
Lewis, P. British Aircraft 1809-1914 London, Putnam 1962
Taylor M.J. H. Jane's Encyclopedia of Aviation.London: Studio Editions, 1989
 Flugsport 1911
 aerofiles
 Flightglobal Archive

1910s British sport aircraft
Biplanes
Single-engined pusher aircraft
Aircraft first flown in 1911
Rotary-engined aircraft